Jekyll is a static site generator written in Ruby by Tom Preston-Werner. It is distributed under the open source MIT license.

History
Jekyll was first released by Tom Preston-Werner in 2008. Jekyll was later taken over by Parker Moore, an employee of GitHub who led the release of Jekyll 1.

Jekyll started a web development trend towards static websites.  Jekyll was ranked the most popular static site generator, largely due to its adoption by GitHub. The idea of the Jamstack formed around Jekyll and the other static site generators that it inspired.

GitHub chose to retain Jekyll version 3.x rather than upgrade to 4.0, released in 2019. In 2021, Jekyll developer Frank Taillandier said that the Jekyll codebase "is in frozen mode and permanent hiatus" and recommended users whose needs are not met by the frozen state of Jekyll move to Eleventy, another static site generator. Frank Taillandier died later in 2021.

Features
Jekyll renders Markdown or Textile and Liquid templates, and produces a complete, static website ready to be served by Apache HTTP Server, Nginx or another web server. Static site generators do not use databases to generate the pages dynamically. Instead Jekyll supports loading content from YAML, JSON, CSV, and TSV files into the Liquid templating system.  Jekyll is the engine behind GitHub Pages, a GitHub feature that allows users to host websites based on their GitHub repositories for no additional cost.

Jekyll can be used in combination with front-end frameworks such as Bootstrap. Jekyll sites can be connected to cloud-based CMS software such as CloudCannon, Forestry, or Siteleaf, enabling content editors to modify site content without having to know how to code. Besides Jekyll has lot of themes, these themes are powerful, flexible, and feature-rich, each one stored with GitHub Pages and supported by any web project.

References

External links

 

Blog software
Free software programmed in Ruby
Free static website generators
Software using the MIT license